Horn Lake is a lake located north of Forest Lodge, New York. The outlet creek flows into the Indian River. Fish species present in the lake are pumpkinseed sunfish, and brook trout. There is carry down on the northwest shore via trail. No motors are allowed on Horn Lake.

References

Lakes of New York (state)
Lakes of Herkimer County, New York